Mutimer is a surname. Notable people with the surname include:

Jim Mutimer,  New Zealand international footballer
Kurt Mutimer (born 1997), Australian rules footballer
Ray Mutimer, British illustrator
Wally Mutimer (1907–1984), Australian rules footballer